The Pakistan Citizen's Portal (PCP) is a nation-wide grievance management platform initially launched as a government-owned mobile application for the citizens of Pakistan through which they can lodge their complaints with the government.

History 
The Prime Minister of Pakistan, Imran Khan, launched Pakistan Citizen's Portal (PCP) in October 2018.

Functioning 
The Pakistan Citizen's Portal operates under the Prime Minister's Performance Delivery Unit (PMDU).

Other platforms 
 The Pakistan Citizen's Portal launched its web-based services and helpline in September 2020.
 In October 2020, manual complaint lodging facility was provided at the dashboards of government offices for illiterate and physically challenged people.

Achievements 
 The Pakistan Citizen's Portal was ranked as the second best government app in the World Government Summit held in Dubai, out of a total 4,646 mobile applications by 87 countries.

See also 

 Self-enumeration Portal

References 
Connecting citizens of Pakistan with their Government. Prime Minister's Performance Delivery Unit (PMDU) established in 2013 has been reorganized with a new RULES IN 2018

External links 

Pakistani websites
Government of Pakistan
2018 establishments in Pakistan